Royal Air Force Kirton in Lindsey or more simply RAF Kirton in Lindsey is a former Royal Air Force station located  north of Lincoln, Lincolnshire, England.
 
It's an RAF habit (inherited from the RFC) to name its bases after the nearest railway station, possibly to simplify the process of issuing Rail Warrants to personnel posted there. By that token, the site should be RAF Kirton Lindsey, Kirton Lindsey being the name of the nearby railway station constructed in 1849. No.255 Squadron's Operations Record Book (ORB) consistently uses that version of the name. So does the airfield's separate ORB, from the date of the site's WWII creation (15 May 1940) through to May 1941. After mid-1941 and the departure of No.255 Squadron, use of RAF Kirton-in-Lindsey begins to appear in the site's own records – eventually dominating.

On 25 March 2013 it was announced the MOD planned to dispose of the airfield and technical facilities with only accommodation remaining, which was emptied later that year. The airfield use to host No. 1 Air Control Centre (1ACC), the RAF's only deployable ground-based early warning and air control radar unit, which was parented by RAF Scampton.

First World War
The Royal Flying Corps and later Royal Air Force airfield at Kirton in Lindsey was used during the First World War from December 1916 to June 1919. The airfield was used by B Flight of 33 Squadron from nearby Gainsborough until June 1918; 33 Squadron was a home defence squadron equipped with the Bristol Fighters and Avro 504s.

With the end of the war, the airfield was returned to agricultural use.

RAF Fighter Command use
The airfield was built on a new site by John Laing & Son in the late 1930s. It opened in May 1940 as a Fighter Command Station covering the NE of England during the Second World War. Many Boulton Paul Defiant and Supermarine Spitfire Squadrons rested here for a short time during the Battle of Britain.

Sgt Ian Clenshaw was the first pilot casualty during the Battle of Britain, when he flew on a dawn patrol from here on 10 July 1940, and was killed in what is generally regarded as a disorientation accident.

The airfield was home of Number 71 Squadron of the RAF's Fighter Command.  The squadron was made up of mostly American pilots and was one of the "Eagle Squadrons" of American volunteers who fought in World War II prior to the American entry into the war.  71 Squadron was assigned the squadron code XR.

The squadron arrived at the station in November 1940 and by January the squadron was declared combat ready. They began flying convoy escorts over the North Sea.  On 9 April No. 71 was moved to RAF Martlesham Heath.

The following units were also here at some point:

RAF units and aircraft

USAAF use

Kirton in Lindsey was allocated to the United States Army Air Forces Eighth Air Force in 1942.  It was assigned USAAF Station number 349, code "KL"

1st Fighter Group
Beginning in June 1942, the 94th Fighter Squadron of the 1st Fighter Group at RAF Goxhill used the station for training with Lockheed P-38 Lightnings.  The squadron remained until October.

81st Fighter Group 
In October 1942, the 91st Fighter Squadron of the 81st Fighter Group used the station for training.   The squadron arrived in Europe from Muroc Army Air Field, California flying Bell P-39 Airacobras.  The squadron remained until December then departed for French Morocco as part of Twelfth Air Force.

RAF Flying Training Command use
In May 1943, the station was returned to RAF control for use as a Fighter Operational Training Unit with Spitfires of No. 53 OTU from Llandow. Caistor and Hibaldstow being used as satellite airfields.   Kirton in Lindsay was a training station and had the following units stationed at it, during the Cold War
 May 1946 to 1948, No. 7 Service Flying Training School RAF with Oxfords from Sutton Bridge, moved to Cottesmore.
 1948 to 1952, Used by non-flying RAF Training Schools.
 1952 to 1957, No. 2 ITS (later renamed No. 1 ITS), an Officer Cadet Training Unit with de Havilland Tiger Moths.
 1957 to 1959, Airfield closed and on Care and Maintenance (but still used by 643 Volunteer Gliding School).
 August 1959 to December 1965, Reopened with No. 7 School of Technical Training and 643 Volunteer Gliding School.

British Army use
In 1966, control of Kirton in Lindsey was transferred to the British Army.

The 1st Battalion, Royal Northumberland Fusiliers arrived in June 1966 and were immediately sent to Aden from August 1966 to June 1967. On 23 April 1968, the battalion was amalgamated into the Royal Regiment of Fusiliers and the camp was known as 'St. Georges Barracks'.  The regiment completed tours of Northern Ireland, before departing for Gibraltar in 1971.

In 1972 the site was passed on to the Royal Artillery and the station was renamed 'Napier Barracks'. In 2004 22 Regiment Royal Artillery left Kirton in Lindsey, to be absorbed into 39 Regiment at Albemarle Barracks, Northumberland.

Due to the Royal Artillery association, the Army Cadet Force detachment which is still housed there has the Royal Artillery cap badge.

Return to RAF control
In 2004, the station was returned to RAF control and became the home of No. 1 Air Control Centre (No. 1 ACC), a deployable Air Surveillance and Control System, which relocated from RAF Boulmer. The unit refurbished the hangars and associated buildings on the technical site, as well as reopening the Junior Ranks accommodation and Mess.  Across the road the historic Officers' Mess was reopened as a Combined Officers, Warrant Officers, and SNCOs' Mess.  The associated Service Families Accommodation was also occupied as well as the Gymnasium. In 2005, the opening of the Control and Reporting Centre at nearby RAF Scampton increased personnel numbers significantly.  Junior Ranks from both stations were accommodated on the RAF Kirton in Lindsey technical site, SNCOs re-occupied the former SNCOs Mess at RAF Scampton and the Officers' Mess at RAF Kirton in Lindsey reverted to Officers only.  At this time the unit became a satellite administered by, RAF Scampton.

In 2012, the technical site was vacated when No. 1 ACC moved to RAF Scampton.  During the same period the Junior Ranks Mess, accommodation blocks and dental centre were all closed.  Junior Ranks were moved to accommodation at RAF Scampton, while the Officers' Mess again became a Combined Mess for Officers, Warrant Officers and SNCOs. The Gym and a number of Service Families Accommodation were retained until 2014 when the final occupants vacated and the houses were handed back to Annington Homes who put them on the open market. The technical site was also sold by the MOD in 2014 to Acorn Recyclers. Parts of the site are now being used for Airsoft games.

See also

List of former Royal Air Force stations

References

Citations

Bibliography

 Freeman, Roger A. (1978) Airfields of the Eighth: Then and Now. After the Battle .
 Freeman, Roger A. (1991) The Mighty Eighth The Colour Record. Cassell & Co. .
Halpenny, Bruce Barrymore Action Stations: Wartime Military Airfields of Lincolnshire and the East Midlands v. 2 .

Maurer, Maurer (1983). Air Force Combat Units of World War II. Maxwell AFB, Alabama: Office of Air Force History. .
 Otter, Parrick (1996).  Lincolnshire Airfields in the Second World War .

External links

   www.controltowers.co.uk Kirton in Lindsey

Airfields of the VIII Fighter Command in the United Kingdom
Royal Air Force stations in Lincolnshire
Royal Air Force stations of World War II in the United Kingdom
RAF